This is a list of the main career statistics of professional Zimbabwean tennis player Cara Black.

Major finals

Grand Slam tournament finals

Doubles: 9 (5–4)

Mixed doubles: 8 (5–3)
By winning the 2010 Australian Open title, Black completed the mixed doubles Career Grand Slam. She became the sixth female player in history to achieve this.

Year-end championships finals

Doubles: 9 (3–6)

Premier 5/Premier Mandatory finals

Doubles: 31 (17–14)

WTA career finals

Singles: 2 (1–1)

Doubles: 109 (60–49)

ITF finals

Singles Finals (6-5)

Doubles (11–3)

Grand Slam performance timelines

Doubles 
Only Main Draw results in WTA Tour, Grand Slam Tournaments and Olympic Games are included in win–loss records.
This table is current through the 2015 Wimbledon.

Mixed doubles

Black, Cara